Devonta Montrell "Tay" Glover-Wright (born June 28, 1992) is a Canadian football cornerback. He played college football at Highland, Eastern Arizona and Utah State. He has also been a member of the Atlanta Falcons, Green Bay Packers, Indianapolis Colts, Philadelphia Eagles and New York Giants.

Early years
Glover-Wright lettered as a sophomore and junior at Campbell High School in Smyrna, Georgia, where he played quarterback, wide receiver and safety. He earned all-county honors and helped the team advance to the playoffs twice. He played his senior season of high school football at Pebblebrook High School in Mableton, Georgia in 2009. He then transferred back to Campbell High School for the second semester. He graduated from Campbell High.

College career
Glover-Wright was a quarterback and wide receiver for the Highland Scotties of Highland Community College in 2010 and the Eastern Arizona Gila Monsters of Eastern Arizona College in 2011. In 2011, he helped the Gila Monsters finish the year with an 8-4 record and a berth in the Top of the Mountains Bowl. He passed for 158 yards and 2 touchdowns, rushed for 684 yards and 1 touchdown, and caught 20 passes for 461 yards and 4 touchdowns over his two-year junior college career. He also returned 9 kicks for 243 yards and had a 98-yard touchdown return.

Glover-Wright then transferred to Utah State University, where he played for the Utah State Aggies from 2012 to 2013 as a cornerback. He played in 13 games, starting 1, in 2012 and recorded 17 tackles. He also blocked a punt. He spent time at quarterback in 2012 as well, accumulating season totals of 12 rushes for 66 yards and 1 pass completions for 9 yards.

He played in 14 games, starting ten, his senior year in 2013. He finished the year with totals of 52 tackles and 10 pass breakups. He also had 19 kickoff returns for 429 yards and 8 rushing attempts for 39 yards.

He appeared in 27 games, starting 11, during his time at Utah State and recorded career totals of 69 tackles, 10 pass breakups, 1 sack, 1 forced fumble and 1 fumble recovery. He had 105 rushing yards on 20 attempts as well. He graduated from Utah State in the spring of 2014 with a degree in interdisciplinary studies.

Professional career

Atlanta Falcons
Glover-Wright signed with the Atlanta Falcons in May 2014 after going undrafted in the 2014 NFL Draft. He was released by the team on August 24, 2014.

Green Bay Packers
Glover-Wright was signed to the Green Bay Packers' practice squad on October 6, 2014. He signed a future contract with the Packers on January 20, 2015. He was released by the team on September 5, 2015.

Indianapolis Colts
Glover-Wright was signed to the Indianapolis Colts' practice squad on October 5, 2015. He was promoted to the active roster on December 17. He played in two games for the Colts during the 2015 season.

Glover-Wright was released by the Colts on September 3, 2016, and signed to the practice squad on September 14. He was released by the Colts on September 19, 2016.

Philadelphia Eagles
On July 31, 2017, Glover-Wright signed with the Philadelphia Eagles. He was waived on August 26, 2017.

New York Giants
On August 27, 2017, Glover-Wright was claimed off waivers by the New York Giants. He was waived on September 1, 2017.

Calgary Stampeders
On October 17, 2017, Glover-Wright was signed to the Calgary Stampeders' practice roster.

Statistics
Source: NFL.com

Personal life
Glover-Wright's uncle, Jeffrey Wright, played football at Georgia Tech from 1990 to 1993. Glover-Wright interned at Intermountain Physical Therapy during his senior year of college.

References

External links
 Atlanta Falcons bio
 College stats

1992 births
Living people
People from Smyrna, Georgia
Sportspeople from Cobb County, Georgia
Players of American football from Georgia (U.S. state)
American football cornerbacks
American football quarterbacks
American football wide receivers
American football return specialists
African-American players of American football
Highland Scotties football players
Eastern Arizona Gila Monsters football players
Utah State Aggies football players
Atlanta Falcons players
Green Bay Packers players
Indianapolis Colts players
Philadelphia Eagles players
New York Giants players
African-American players of Canadian football
Canadian football defensive backs
Calgary Stampeders players
21st-century African-American sportspeople